Chen Kangbo (陈康伯) was a prime minister (宰相) of the Southern Song dynasty and chief strategist for the Song victory against the Jin in the Battle of Caishi. He served as a military supervisor and naval commander.

Battle of Caishi 
Chen was the chief architect of the Song strategy and victory at Caishi. Another account tells of how General Chen Lugong (Chen Kangbo)「陈鲁公（陈康伯）采石」 led naval regiments to defeat the Jin and defend the Song.

See also 
 Battle of Caishi

Notes 

Song dynasty politicians